Polypoetes oteroi is a moth of the family Notodontidae. It is found in Venezuela.

The length of the forewings is 15–18 mm for males. The ground color of the forewings is brown, but slightly darker brown in the distal area. There is a broad translucent white central area on the hindwings, which is almost transparent. The outer margin is dark brown from the apex to the anal fold.

Etymology
The species is named in honor of Luis Daniel Otero, from the Universidad de Los Andes (Mérida, Venezuela).

References

Moths described in 2008
Notodontidae of South America